Uto-Aztecan languages are divided into two groups, Northern and Southern Uto-Aztecan languages. They are spoken in the southwestern United States, north and central Mexico, and in Central America.

Northern Uto-Aztecan

Ute/Southern Paiute
Luke's gospel was completed in 2006 and published by Wycliffe Bible Translators.

Shoshone
Beverly Crum published her translation of Mark into Shoshone in 1986. This was published by the U.S. Center for World Missions

Comanche
Mark was translated into Comanche language (Uto-Aztecan languages) by Elliot Canonge of Wycliffe Bible Translators, and was published by the American Bible Society in 1958 as Mark-ha tsaatü narümu'ipü̲.An edition of the Gospel of Mark, containing a Commanche Language Key, was published by authority of Big Cove Baptist Church, Cherokee, NC, and distributed by the Global Bible Society.

Northern Paiute

John and Joy Anderson of Wycliffe Bible Translators published a translation into Northern Paiute of Mark's gospel in 1977 and the whole New Testament in 1985.

Hopi
The four gospels was published in 1929 by the American Bible Society. The New Testament was first published in 1972. It seems to mainly have been the work of Jonathan Ekstrom and Starlie "Elsie" Polacca.

Southern Uto-Aztecan

Nahuatl
Shortly after the Spanish conquest of Mexico, Alonso de Molina translated the Doctrina christiana into Nahuatl, which was printed in 1546. The Spanish priest Bernardino de Sahagún attempted to translate the whole Bible into Nahuatl in order to make the Nahua understand the Word of God, but this was forbidden by the Inquisition in Sevilla on 10 May 1576.

It was not until the 20th century that the whole New Testament was translated into this language, when Protestant missionaries, at that time mainly from North America, started to translate the Scriptures into several Native Central American languages. Since then, according to the Summer Institute of Linguistics, the New Testament has been translated into 11 varieties of Nahuatl – Northern Puebla Nahuatl [ncj] (1979), Sierra Puebla Nahuatl [azz] (1979), Tetelcingo Nahuatl [nhg] (1980), Eastern Huasteca Nahuatl [nhe] (1984), Western Huasteca Nahuatl [nhw] (1986), Guerrero Nahuatl [ngu] (1987), Michoacán Nahuatl [ncl] (1998), Central Huasteca Nahuatl [nch] (2005), Northern Oaxaca Nahuatl [nhy] (2006), Southeastern Puebla Nahuatl [npl] (2011), and Zacatlán-Ahuacatlán-Tepetzintla Nahuatl [nhi] (2012) –, and the whole Bible into the three varieties Eastern Huasteca Nahuatl [nhe] (2005), Western Huasteca Nahuatl [nhw] (2004), and Central Huasteca Nahuatl [nch] (2005).

The Eastern Huasteca Nahuatl translation of the whole Bible and most of the Nahuatl translations of the New Testament have been accessible on internet Bible portals since about 2012.

The Protestant Nahuatl Bible translations have been criticized by representatives of the Catholic Church as “full of doctrinal and cultural errors”. After a workshop of Nahuatl-speaking Catholics, mainly priests, from various regions of Mexico, the bishop of San Cristóbal de las Casas, Felipe Arizmendi Esquivel, announced in August 2012 the formation of a catholic National Nahuatl Commission for a single translation of the whole Bible into Nahuatl, which is to be understood by the speakers of different Nahuatl varieties. However, a date for completion has not been mentioned.

Nawat/Pipil
The Bible is being translated into the Pipil or Nawat language, spoken by a minority in El Salvador. This translation is being done by Alan R. King, a linguist with "Ne Bibliaj Tik Nawat". The Bible is being translated from the original languages. The New Testament is complete, and work is ongoing on the Old Testament.

External links
Ne Bibliaj

O'odham
The New Testament in the O'odham language (Uto-Aztecan family) of the O'odham of the Sonoran Desert of southeastern Arizona and northwest Mexico was translated by Dean and Lucille Saxton of Wycliffe Bible Translators. It was published by The World Home Bible League and The Canadian Home Bible League in 1975. Work is being done on the Old Testament.

Pima Bajo
Portions, 1994

Tarahumara, Central
Wycliffe Bible Translators' Tarahumara New Testament was published in the 1972. This was preceded by the gospels and acts being published in 1969. Little Flock Christian Fellowship updated the New testament and published both on the Internet. LFCF's updates were mostly dealing with the orthography.

Tarahumara New Testament

Tarahumara, Baja
New Testament, 2007

Northern Tepehuan
The New Testament, translated by Burton William Bascom and Marvel Bascom was published in 1981 by the World Home Bible League.

Yaqui
The Bible League published John and Mary Dedrick's translation of the New Testament in 1977, a second edition was published in 2003.

References

Uto-Aztecan languages
Uto-Aztecan